Slane Castle (Irish Cáisleán Bhaile Shláine) is located in the village of Slane, within the Boyne Valley of County Meath, Ireland. The castle has been the family seat of the Conyngham family since it was built in the late 18th century, on land first purchased in 1703 by Brig.-Gen. Henry Conyngham.

It holds the Slane Festival within its grounds, with the Irish Independent claiming in 2004 that "Slane today is the kind of internationally recognised venue that can claim even Madonna's attention". Its sloping lawns form a natural amphitheatre.

History 

On the eastward side of the castle demesne, directly between the River Boyne and the village's Church of Ireland church in Slane, lay the ruins of St. Erc's Hermitage, a 15th-century multi-storey chapel, and with some 500 metres westward of St. Erc's Hermitage an ancient well can also be found. However, with the arrival of Christianity in Ireland, and the policy of Christian reinterpretation for traditionally pagan sites, the well is now more commonly referred to as Our Lady's Well.

Prior to the 1688 overthrow of the House of Stuart, Slane Castle had been in the possession of the Flemings, Hiberno-Normans who had aligned themselves with the  Jacobites in the War of the Grand Alliance, and thus after the Williamite victory, their property was chosen for confiscation. Christopher, 17th Baron Slane (1669 – 14 July 1726; created The 1st Viscount Longford by Queen Anne in 1713), was the last Fleming Lord of Slane. 

Overlooking the River Boyne, just a few kilometres upstream from Newgrange and the site of the famous Battle of the Boyne, Slane Castle in its existing form was constructed under the direction of William Burton Conyngham, together with his nephew The 1st Marquess Conyngham. The reconstruction dates back to 1785 and is principally the work of James Gandon, James Wyatt and Francis Johnston. Francis Johnston was also the architect responsible for the gothic gates on the Mill Hill, located to the east of the castle.

The Conynghams are originally a Scottish Protestant family, who planted in Ireland in 1611, during the Plantation of Ulster in County Donegal. Concurrently, the then head of the family, Charles Conyngham, renamed the village in his own honour as Mountcharles (pronounced locally in South Donegal as 'Mount-char-liss'). The family also controlled an extensive estate in West Donegal, especially in The Rosses district.

The association between the Ulster-Scots Conynghams and the Slane Estate in County Meath dates back over 300 years, ever since the property was taken by the family following the Williamite Confiscations in 1701. Around that time, the family moved their main ancestral seat south from County Donegal in west Ulster to Slane.

The present owner of the castle is Henry Conyngham, who styles himself as The 8th Marquess Conyngham. The eldest son of Lord Conyngham is Alex, Earl of Mount Charles.

In 1984, Irish band U2 took up residence at the castle to write and record their album The Unforgettable Fire.

In 1991, a fire in the castle caused extensive damage to the building and completely gutted the eastern section facing the River Boyne. The castle reopened in 2001 after the completion of a ten-year restoration programme. In 2003, a cannon associated with the castle was found in the nearby River Boyne

Concerts at Slane

Since 1981, the grounds of Slane Castle have been used to host rock concerts. The natural amphitheatre has an 80,000 person capacity. The concerts were launched by the then Earl of Mount Charles (popularly known for several decades as Henry Mount Charles or Henry Mountcharles; since March 2009, he has been known as The 8th Marquess Conyngham), the owner of the castle.

Performers who have headlined Slane concerts since 1981 include The Rolling Stones, U2, Guns N' Roses, Metallica, Red Hot Chili Peppers, Queen, David Bowie, Neil Young, Bryan Adams, Bob Dylan, Bruce Springsteen, Robbie Williams, Madonna, R.E.M., Foo Fighters, Celtic Woman and Oasis. On 28 May 2011, Kings Of Leon headlined the 30th anniversary event at Slane Castle. Five support acts played, including Thin Lizzy, who in an earlier line-up headlined the first Slane Festival in 1981.

Celtic Woman filmed their second DVD at Slane Castle, called Celtic Woman: A New Journey in August 2006, and in 2001 U2 filmed the DVD U2 Go Home: Live From Slane Castle, which was released in 2003. They also recorded their 1984 album, The Unforgettable Fire, there while taking up residence for a time. Parts of Madonna's documentary-film I'm Going to Tell You a Secret were filmed at Slane Castle in 2004. Bon Jovi performed at Slane Castle in June 2013.

References

External links

 Slane Castle
 National Library of Ireland: Conyngham Papers related to their estates in counties Clare, Donegal and Meath

Castles in County Meath
Conyngham family